The Gastown Gazette is a national arts and culture magazine published in Vancouver, British Columbia by Northwest Community Enterprises Ltd.

History

Gazette was founded by Andrew Patton November 16, 2012. The first electronic edition was published February 10, 2013.  By June 23, 2013, it was the sixth most popular news publication measured by Facebook “likes” in the Lower Mainland.

Content

Gazette focuses on news, politics, art, sports, travel, and fashion.  

The online site received almost immediate attention in local and national media for its reporting about protests against gentrification in the Downtown Eastside and Gastown area of Vancouver.  References to the Gazette's stories have appeared in The Province Newspaper the Globe and Mail, CBC radio and television, CTV Television, and News 1130.

References

External links
Canadian Public Relations Society

2012 establishments in British Columbia
Newspapers published in Vancouver
Publications established in 2012